Phillaur was a Lok Sabha parliamentary constituency in Punjab. It was dissolved in 2008 and replaced by Anandpur Sahib.

Members of Parliament

2009 onwards: Anandpur Sahib

See also
 Phillaur
 List of Constituencies of the Lok Sabha

Former Lok Sabha constituencies of Punjab, India
2008 disestablishments in India
Constituencies disestablished in 2008
Jalandhar district
Former constituencies of the Lok Sabha